Gaertnera ternifolia is a species of flowering plant in the family Rubiaceae. It is endemic to Sri Lanka.

References

ternifolia
Endemic flora of Sri Lanka
Endangered plants
Taxonomy articles created by Polbot